is a Japanese slice of life romantic comedy manga series written and illustrated by Yumiko Kawahara.

The manga was serialized in Shogakukan's Bessatsu Shōjo Comic from the March 1983 issue to the May 1986 issue, with a total of 39 chapters. The individual chapters were compiled by Shogakukan under their imprint Flower Comics into ten tankōbon volumes. In 2014, the series was reissued as bunkoban edition of six volumes were published by Asahi Sonorama under imprint Sonorama Comic Bunko.

In 1987, an television drama special adaptation was broadcast by Fuji TV.

Plot
Serika Matsumoto moves to Tokyo to begin her university life, and while looking for a room, she come across a beautiful woman dressed in kimono, Suzune Sakuragawa. Suzune offers her a room at the Milk House, a Western-style house, and she accepts it with a half-hearted reply. Serika considers looking for another room, but when a woman she meets in town, Mizuki, moves in, she decides to live in the Milk House. Later, she was joined by Professor Yoshikawa and his son Isamu, and their lively lodging life at the Milk House begins.

Media

Television drama
A live action TV drama special aired on August 3, 1987 on Fuji TV's  program.

Cast
Yōko Ishino as Serika Matsumoto
Hideyuki Nakayama as Fuji Yasuhara
 as Takayuki Tashiro
Fukumi Kuroda as Mizuki Hashimoto
 as Suzune Sakuragawa
 as Maiko Yoshikawa
Katsuma Nakagaki (中垣克麻 Nagaki Katsuma) as Isamu Yoshikawa
Kōji Nakamoto as Professor Yoshikawa
 as Tetsu
 as Ron
 as Yasu
Miyuki Imori as Yayoi Sakurada
 as Sensei
Seiko Asaga (浅賀誠子 Asaga Seiko) as Store manager
 as Officer
Takeo Chii as Hanada-gumi, Kumichō

Reception
In 1985, the series won the 31st Shogakukan Manga Award for shōjo.

References

External links

1983 manga
Slice of life anime and manga
Shōjo manga
Shogakukan manga
Japanese television dramas based on manga
Fuji TV original programming
Romantic comedy anime and manga
Winners of the Shogakukan Manga Award for shōjo manga